Cnemaspis narathiwatensis, also known as the Narathiwat rock gecko,  is a species of gecko endemic to Thailand.

References

narathiwatensis
Reptiles described in 2010
Taxa named by Kirati Kunya